St Giles’ Church, Sheldon is a Grade II* listed parish church in the Church of England in Sheldon, Birmingham.

History

The church dates from 1291, but the current building is mostly 14th century. It was restored in 1867 by Slater and Carpenter.
 
From 1690  the rector was Thomas Bray who later helped to establish the Church of England in Maryland.

Organ

The two manual 14-stop pipe organ was installed by Thomas Hewins. A specification of the organ can be found on the National Pipe Organ Register.

See also
Listed buildings in Birmingham

Other Medieval churches in Birmingham
St Nicolas' Church, Kings Norton 
St Laurence's Church, Northfield
St Edburgha's Church, Yardley

References

Church of England church buildings in Birmingham, West Midlands
Grade II* listed buildings in Birmingham
Grade II* listed churches in the West Midlands (county)